Gurrah (garat) was a kind of calico produced in Northeast India during the 18th century. Gurrah was one of the cotton piece goods exported to England and France.

Name 
Gurrah may be a name stemmed from Hindi .

Characteristics 
Gurrah was a typical quality plain cloth. It was an unbleached cotton material.

Use 
It was processed and used in many household items such as table cloth, etc. Gurrah was also used for printing base material in England and France. Gurrah was also a part of Indian cloths exported to America.

Gurrah has been mentioned as a dress material in petticoat.

See also 

 Bafta cloth

References 

Textiles
Woven fabrics